The Ducal Palace is a Renaissance building in the Italian city of Urbino in the Marche. One of the most important monuments in Italy, it is listed as UNESCO World Heritage Site since 1998.

History

The construction of the Ducal Palace was begun for Duke Federico III da Montefeltro around the mid-fifteenth century by the Florentine Maso di Bartolomeo. The new construction included the pre-existing Palace of the Jole. The solid rock hillside salient was impregnable to siege but was problematic for carving out the foundation of a palace.  Thus, a prominent fortress-builder, Luciano Laurana, from Dalmatia, was hired to build the substructure; but Laurana departed Urbino before the living quarters of the palace were begun.  After Laurana, the designer or designers of the Ducal Palace are unknown with certainty. Leading High Renaissance architect Donato Bramante was a native of Urbino and may have worked on the completion of the palace.

The Ducal Palace is famous as the setting of the conversations which Baldassare Castiglione represents as having taken place in the Hall of Vigils in 1507 in his Book of the Courtier.

The palace continued in use as a government building into the 20th century, housing municipal archives and offices, and public collections of antique inscriptions and sculpture (the Galleria Nazionale delle Marche, see below). Restorations completed in 1985 have reopened the extensive subterranean network to visitors.

Studiolo and twin chapels

The Ducal Palace featured several rooms that reflect Federico's devotion to Classical and humanistic studies and served his daily routine, which included visiting the palace's lararium and reading Greek literature.  These learned and explicitly pagan touches were atypical of a medieval palazzo.

Studiolo

A central element in this plan is the studiolo (a small study or cabinet for contemplation), a room measuring just 3.60 x 3.35m and facing away from the city of Urbino and towards the Duke's rural lands.  Its beautifully executed intarsia work, surrounding the room's occupant with trompe-l'œil shelves, benches, and half-open latticework doors displaying symbolic objects representing the Liberal Arts, is the single most famous example of this Italian craft of inlay.  The benches hold musical instruments, and the shelves contain representations of books and musical scores, scientific instruments (including an astrolabe and an armillary sphere), study furnishings (including a writing desk and an hourglass), weapons and armor, and various other objects (e.g. parrots in cages and a mazzocchio).

The studiolo also features iconic representations of several persons, both contemporary and historical.  On the intarsia panels are depicted statues of Federico in scholarly attire and of Faith, Hope, and Charity.  Above the intarsia panels are portraits of great authors by Joos van Wassenhove (with reworking by Pedro Berruguete):

The upper register (shown in the diagram's outside rows and columns) presents Classical and humanistic writers, as opposed to the religious figures (broadly speaking) of the lower register (inside).

Chapel of Absolution and Temple of the Muses

Downstairs from the studiolo are a twinned pair of chapels, one Christian and one pagan.  The vestibule leading to them emphasizes their complementarity with this inscribed elegiac couplet:

The Temple of the Muses, which may have been used as the personal studiolo of Federico's son Guidobaldo, originally featured paintings of the Muses as "sober musicians" that are perhaps the work of Giovanni Santi.

Galleria Nazionale delle Marche
The Galleria Nazionale delle Marche (National Gallery of the Marche), housed in the palace, is one of the most important collections of Renaissance art in the world. It includes important works by artists such as Raphael, Van Wassenhove (a Last Supper with portraits of the Montefeltro family and the court), Melozzo da Forlì, Piero della Francesca (with the famous Flagellation), Paolo Uccello, Timoteo Viti, and other 15th century artists, as well as a late Resurrection by Titian.

Selected highlights

See also
 List of national galleries

References

Sources
 Luciano Cheles, The Studiolo of Urbino: An Iconographic Investigation (Penn State Press, 1986)
 Robert Kirkbride, Architecture and Memory. The Renaissance Studioli of Federico da Montefeltro (Columbia University Press, 2008)

External links
 Galleria Nazionale delle Marche - Official website

Ducale, Urbino
Urbino
Renaissance architecture in le Marche
15th-century establishments in Italy
Art museums and galleries in Marche
Museums in Urbino
National museums of Italy
Ducal Palace, Urbino
Duchy of Urbino